Adirondack Red is a potato variety with red flesh and skin, bred by Cornell University potato breeders Robert Plaisted, Ken Paddock and Walter De Jong, and released in 2004.

The Adirondack varieties are unusual because both the skin and the flesh are colored and have high levels of anti-oxidants. They are described as "Early- to mid-season, medium- to high-yielding variety. Dark green decumbent to spreading vines bear oblong to long, slightly flattened, purplish-red-skinned tubers with shallow eyes and pink to red flesh."

Adirondack Red was found to be susceptible to silver scurf disease, as well as the golden cyst nematode. It was also found to have moderate resistance to common scab.

See also
 Adirondack Blue potato

References

External links
 Harrison, Christy, "Heirlooms-to-Be", Gourmet Magazine, 2/21/2008
 Washington State University, Potato Varieties: Red-skinned Varieties
 "Adirondack Reds are not experimental", Times Union' (Albany, NY), 12/10/2008

Crops originating from the Americas
Potato cultivars